The Okinawa robin (Larvivora namiyei) is a passerine bird endemic to Okinawa of Japan. It previously was considered a subspecies of the Ryukyu robin (Larvivora komadori ).

Behavior 
Sometimes forages for food near the ground. Predation by invasive species such as the small Indian mongoose negatively impacts the Okinawa Robin.

References

Okinawa robin
Endemic birds of Japan
Okinawa robin
Okinawa robin